The School of Computational Science & Engineering is an academic unit located within the College of Computing at the Georgia Institute of Technology (Georgia Tech). It conducts both research and teaching activities related to computational science and engineering at the undergraduate and graduate levels. These activities focus on "making fundamental advances in the creation and application of new computational methods and techniques in order to enable breakthroughs in scientific discovery and engineering practice."

History
The School of Computational Science & Engineering was founded in 2005 as the Computational Science and Engineering Division. It was elevated to "school" status in March 2010, and Richard Fujimoto was appointed as the school's founding chair. The creation of the school represented a continuation of the College of Computing’s efforts to define and delineate the field of computing into focused bodies of study, emphasizing computational science and engineering as an academic discipline as well as highlighting the interdisciplinary nature of the field. Under Fujimoto's leadership as founding chair, the school quickly grew to 13 tenure-track faculty and $8.8 million in research expenditures by 2013. In July 2014, David A. Bader became the second chair of the department, and Fujimoto returned to the faculty as Chair Emeritus. During Bader's tenure as chair, the school's graduate student enrollment more than doubled, and annual research expenditures increased from $4.3 million to $7.5 million. Bader also launched a strategic partnership program to allow companies to work directly with CSE faculty and graduate students. In 2019, he announced that he would not seek another term as chair and would return to the faculty and research. Haesun Park, who had previously served as the school's associate chair, was named chair in August 2020.

Degrees offered
The School of Computational Science & Engineering offers bachelor's degrees, master's degrees, and doctoral degrees in several fields. These degrees are technically granted by the School's parent organization, the Georgia Tech College of Computing, and often awarded in conjunction with other academic units within Georgia Tech.

Doctoral degrees
 Ph.D. in Computational Science & Engineering
 Ph.D. in Bioengineering
 Ph.D. in Bioinformatics
 Ph.D. in Computer Science
 Ph.D. in Machine Learning

Master's degrees
 M.S. in Computational Science & Engineering
 M.S. in Analytics 
 M.S. in Bioengineering
 M.S. in Computer Science

Bachelor's degrees
 B.S. in Computer Science

Research
The faculty and students of the school lead and conduct a variety of research in areas including High-performance computing, data science, visual analytics, scientific computing and simulation, computational bioscience and biomedicine, artificial intelligence, and machine learning. As of the 2020 fiscal year, the school had $24.9 million in active funding for research and 74 active research projects. The school has identified several growing research areas, including scientific artificial intelligence, application-driven post-Moore’s law computing, data science for fighting disease, and urban computing, as presenting particular strategic opportunities for its researchers in upcoming years.

Notable faculty
 Srinivas Aluru
 Mark Borodovsky
 Umit Catalyurek
 Edmond Chow
 Richard M. Fujimoto
 Haesun Park
 Richard Vuduc

Location
The School of Computational Science & Engineering’s administrative offices, as well as those of most of its faculty and graduate students, are located in the CODA Building.

See also
 Georgia Institute of Technology College of Computing

References

External links
 Georgia Institute of Technology School of Computational Science & Engineering

School of Computational Science and Engineering
Information schools
Educational institutions established in 2010
2010 establishments in Georgia (U.S. state)